Allosorius is a genus of rove beetles.

Placement
Allosorius is uncontroversially placed in the tribe Osoriini of the subfamily Osoriinae.

Distribution
Allosorius is indigenous to Africa, Indonesia and New Guinea.

References
 Herman, L.H. 2001: Catalog of the Staphylinidae (Insecta, Coleoptera): 1758 to the end of the second millennium. III. Oxyteline group. Bulletin of the American Museum of Natural History (ISSN 0003-0090 eISSN 1937-3546), (265): 1067–1806. Abstract and full article (PDF) [See p. 1148]

External links
 iNaturalist

Staphylinidae genera
Osoriinae
Beetles of Africa